Absolute Drift is a racing game developed and published by Funselektor Labs. It was released on 29 July 2015 on Windows, OS X and Linux. It was also released on 29 August 2016 and 25 August 2017 on the PlayStation 4 and Xbox One respectively as Absolute Drift: Zen Edition. Physical media copies on disc were released for the PlayStation 4 platform through Limited Run Games on 13 October 2017, and was limited to 4,000 printed copies. A Nintendo Switch version was released on 3 December 2020.

Gameplay 
Absolute Drift features 5 free roam areas and 34 tracks. In the free roam areas, there are various objectives for the player to complete which unlock more levels and cars. The tracks also have objectives to complete, including gaining points in a drift-based scoring system.

Release 
Absolute Drift: Zen Edition has been released on the PlayStation 4 which went on sale on 15 November in the United States. It was also released on the Xbox One which was also released in November. Absolute Drift began on Windows, OS X and Linux on 29 August 2016 which is a month before the Zen Edition release. It was then made available on iOS and Android in 2018. A Nintendo Switch version was released on 3 December 2020.

Reception 

On Windows, Absolute Drift received mixed or average reviews from critics on Metacritic, while Absolute Drift: Zen Edition received generally favorable reviews on the PlayStation 4. GameSpew reviewed the game on PlayStation 4 and gave the game a 5 out of 10.

See also 
Art of Rally, 2020 racing game by Funselektor Labs

References

External links 

2015 video games
Android (operating system) games
Indie video games
IOS games
Linux games
MacOS games
PlayStation 4 games
Nintendo Switch games
Racing video games
Steam Greenlight games
Video games developed in Canada
Video games set in Japan
Windows games
Xbox One games
Noodlecake Games games